The TR class are a class of diesel locomotives built by Progress Rail, Patterson, Georgia for TasRail in 2013–2014. They are currently the main Tasmanian locomotive class handling the majority of mainline services across the state.

History
In December 2011, TasRail awarded Progress Rail a contract for 17 PR22L locomotives. They were the first new locomotives delivered to Tasmania since the Za class in 1976. The first TR class were delivered in November 2013 with the balance delivered in 2014.

References

Co-Co locomotives
Diesel locomotives of Tasmania
Railway locomotives introduced in 2013
3 ft 6 in gauge locomotives of Australia